The Secunderabad–Hisar Express is an Express train belonging to South Central Railway zone that runs between  and  in India. It is currently being operated with 17037/17038 train numbers on bi-weekly basis.

Service

The 17037/Secunderabad–Hisar Express has an average speed of 52 km/hr and covers 2416 km in 46h 20m. The 17038/Hisar–Secunderabad Express has an average speed of 52 km/hr and covers 2416 km in 46h 45m.

Route and halts 

The important halts of the train are:

Coach composition

The train has standard ICF rakes with a max speed of 110 kmph. The train consists of 22 coaches:

 2 AC II Tier
 4 AC III Tier
 10 Sleeper coaches
 1 Pantry car
 3 General Unreserved
 2 Seating cum Luggage Rake

Traction

Both trains are hauled by a Lallaguda Loco Shed based twins WAP-4 or WAP-7 electric locomotive from Secunderabad to Ahmedabad. From Ahmedabad trains are hauled by a Bhagat Ki Kothi Loco Shed or Vatva Loco Shed-based WDP-4D diesel locomotive electric locomotive from Hisar Junction and vice versa.

Rake sharing 

The train shares its rake with 17001/17002 Sainagar Shirdi–Secunderabad Express and 17017/17018 Rajkot–Secunderabad Express.

See also 

 Hisar Junction railway station
 Secunderabad Junction railway station
 Sainagar Shirdi–Secunderabad Express
 Rajkot–Secunderabad Express

Notes

References

External links 

 17037/Secunderabad–Hisar Express India Rail Info
 17038/Hisar–Secunderabad Express India Rail Info

Transport in Secunderabad
Transport in Hisar (city)
Express trains in India
Rail transport in Haryana
Rail transport in Rajasthan
Rail transport in Gujarat
Rail transport in Maharashtra
Rail transport in Telangana